Teresa González de Fanning (Nepeña District, Ancash Region, Peru, 12 August 1836 - Miraflores District, Lima, 7 April 1918) was a Peruvian writer and journalist notable for her activism in the education of women. She founded the Liceo Fanning (1881), a women's college, where she implemented her educational approaches. Although a somewhat forgotten figure, she is deemed as the precursor to the integral education of women, with practical connotations (including labor formation) as a form of attaining liberation from the patriarchy. This is notable because, at the time, Peruvian society still considered that female education should only be aimed at improving their role as housewives. She was the widow of Juan Fanning, a Peruvian war hero who perished during the Battle of Miraflores in the War of the Pacific.

Career
A collection of her articles, which were published in El Comercio, were compiled in a booklet entitled Female Education (1898). It was highly critical about women's education, which till then, was exclusively geared to prepare for marriage and motherhood. Gonzalez rejected this type of curriculum, promoting in its place the study of music, writing and mathematics as broader preparation with a practical connotation. She favored job training which would provide a source of income, allowing women to emancipate themselves from dependence on a husband. At lower levels, she suggested a more practical life skills education to learn a trade. On another level, she described a more enlightened education, within scientific and philosophical disciplines. Her views were recognized as a precursor to modern educational programs for women.

Selected works 
 Ambición y abnegación (1886)
 Regina (1886)
 Indómita (1904)
 Roque Moreno (1904)
 Lucecitas (1893)

References

Further reading
 Basadre, Jorge: Historia de la República del Perú. 1822 - 1933, Octava Edición, corregida y aumentada. Vol. 9, Pg. 2166. Editada por el Diario "La República" de Lima y la Universidad "Ricardo Palma". Impreso en Santiago de Chile, 1998. 
Clark, Emily Joy: "Risky Business, Gender Roles, and Reform in Regina (1886) by Teresa González de Fanning." Revista de Estudios Hispánicos 49.3 (2015): 433-56.
Denegri, Francesca: El Abanico y la Cigarrera. La primera generación de mujeres ilustradas en el Perú. Lima, 1996. 
 García y García, Elvira: La mujer peruana a través de los siglos (Tomo II). Lima, 1925. 
 Tauro del Pino, Alberto: Enciclopedia Ilustrada del Perú. Tercera Edición. Tomo 7. FER-GUZ. Lima, PEISA, 2001.  
 Varios autores: Grandes Forjadores del Perú. Lima, Lexus Editores, 2000.

External links
 Institución Educativa Teresa González de Fanning

1836 births
1918 deaths
People from Santa Province
19th-century Peruvian writers
20th-century Peruvian writers
19th-century Peruvian women writers
20th-century Peruvian women writers
Peruvian women journalists
University and college founders
Women founders